Phaulothrips is a genus of thrips in the family Phlaeothripidae.

Species
 Phaulothrips agrestis
 Phaulothrips anici
 Phaulothrips barretti
 Phaulothrips caudatus
 Phaulothrips daguilaris
 Phaulothrips flindersi
 Phaulothrips fuscus
 Phaulothrips inquilinus
 Phaulothrips kingae
 Phaulothrips kranzae
 Phaulothrips longitubus
 Phaulothrips magnificus
 Phaulothrips melanosomus
 Phaulothrips oakeyi
 Phaulothrips orientalis
 Phaulothrips sibylla
 Phaulothrips solifer
 Phaulothrips uptoni
 Phaulothrips vuilleti
 Phaulothrips whyallae

References

Phlaeothripidae
Thrips
Thrips genera